Jurnal (Journal) is an Indonesian flagship news programme which broadcast on Beritasatu. The program broadcast for five times each day through Jurnal Pagi (breakfast news), Jurnal Siang (lunchtime news), Jurnal Petang (evening news), Jurnal Utama (prime news) and Jurnal Malam (night news). Its slogan is "Berita Satu Nomor Satu" (News One is Number One)

Jurnal was replaced with Berita Satu was ended on October 11, 2022, after acquired Beritasatu TV changed to BTV by Enggartiasto Lukita.

References 

Indonesian television news shows
Indonesian-language television shows
2011 Indonesian television series debuts
2010s Indonesian television series
2022 Indonesian television series endings